Podolinella is a genus of proturans in the family Acerentomidae.

Species
 Podolinella podolica Szeptycki, 1995

References

Protura